This is the discography of the American rock band Black Lab.

Studio albums
 Your Body Above Me (Geffen, October 21, 1997)
 See the Sun (Self-released, June 2005)
 Passion Leaves a Trace (Self-released, January 16, 2007)
 Two Strangers (Self-released, October 2010)
 A Raven Has My Heart (Self-released, 2014)
A New World (Self-released, November 2016)

Extended plays

Compilations and reissues

Solo and side projects

Singles

Soundtrack appearances 

 Note: The Transformers Theme is not a cover of the Mutemath version featured on the soundtrack, but a revision of the theme from the original animated feature, The Transformers: The Movie, from 1987.  Originally performed by the band Lion, Paul Durham changed a few lyrics to allow for the absence of the character Unicron that is mentioned in the original track.

References

Discographies of American artists
Rock music group discographies